Ratanchand Hirachand Doshi (1902–1981) was a scion of Walchand group, an industrialist, philanthropist, freedom fighter, and Jain social leader.

Biography
He was son of Hirachand Doshi from his second marriage and was half-brother of Walchand Hirachand, who was born from the first marriage of his father. He was born in Solapur in Maharashtra in a Jain family of Gujarati origin. His other brothers were Gulabchand Hirachand and Lalchand Hirachand.

When he grew up he joined his brother, Walchand and served various group companies like The Scindia Steam Navigation Company Ltd., Walchandnagar Industries, Hindustan Aeronautics Limited, Ravalgaon Sugar, Hindustand Construstion, Premier Automobiles. In 1931, when Walchand floated Indian Hume Pipe, he made Ratanchand its Director-in-charge. Further, he headed Walchand group, Cooper Engineering for several years.

He also served on various committees and planning commission in the 1940s.
He published several books on the Jain religion of which the book titled The Religion of Ahimsa published in 1957 is noted one. He published in the Marathi, as well in Hindi,  biographies on his father Seth Hirachand Nemchand and others like Dinanath Bapuji, Magudkar.

He was trustee of various schools, colleges and hospitals run by Walchand group.

He is survived by a son, Rajas Doshi, who is director in several Walchand group companies.

References

1902 births
1981 deaths
Businesspeople from Maharashtra
20th-century Indian Jains
Hindi-language writers
Gujarati people
Walchand family
Indian independence activists from Maharashtra
English-language writers from India
Marathi-language writers
People from Solapur
Social leaders